Ramstedt may refer to:

 Ramstedt, Germany, a municipality in Schleswig-Holstein, Germany
 Ramstedt's operation or pyloromyotomy, a surgical procedure

People
 Gustaf John Ramstedt (1873–1950), Finnish linguist specializing in Altaic languages
 Johan Ramstedt (1852–1935), Swedish politician
 Conrad Ramstedt (1867–1963), German surgeon

See also
 Römstedt, a municipality in Lower Saxony, Germany